The 1997 Tonga rugby union tour of Africa was a series of matches played in May and June 1997 in Zimbabwe, Namibia and South Africa by Tonga national rugby union team.

Results 
Scores and results list Tonga's points tally first.

References

1997 rugby union tours
1997
1997 in South African rugby union
1997
1997
1997
Rugby union
1997 in Oceanian rugby union
1997 in Zimbabwean sport
Rug
1997 in African rugby union